Bama is a village in the Solenzo Department of Banwa Province in western Burkina Faso. As of 2005 it had a population of 1,080.

This village should not be confused with the much larger town of Bama, the capital of Bama Department in Houet Province, Hauts-Bassins Region.

References

Populated places in the Boucle du Mouhoun Region
Banwa Province